Walter Abbott may refer to:
 Walter Abbott (American football) (born  1936), American football player, coach, college athletics administrator, and university professor
 Walter Abbott (footballer, born 1877) (1877–1941), English footballer for Small Heath, Everton, Burnley and England
 Walter Abbott (footballer, born 1899) (1899 – after 1921), his son, English footballer for Grimsby Town
 Walter Sidney Abbott (1879–1942), American entomologist